Nolan Heavenor (born June 30, 1982 in Victoria, British Columbia) is a former professional lacrosse transition player for the Calgary Roughnecks and Minnesota Swarm of the National Lacrosse League.  He was drafted 17th overall by the Minnesota Swarm in the 2005 NLL Entry Draft from Limestone College (NCAA Division II).  After playing his first season in 2006 for Minnesota, he was traded to the Calgary Roughnecks in exchange for a 2nd round (23rd overall) pick and 3rd round (31st overall) pick in the 2006 NLL Entry Draft.

Heavenor was part of three championship teams: 2009 NLL Champion's Cup with the Roughnecks, 2005 Western Lacrosse Association Mann Cup with the Victoria Shamrocks and the 2002 NCAA Division II Championship with Limestone College.

References

1982 births
Living people
Calgary Roughnecks players
Canadian lacrosse players
Minnesota Swarm players
Lacrosse people from British Columbia
Lacrosse transitions
Sportspeople from Victoria, British Columbia
Limestone Saints athletes
Canadian expatriate sportspeople in the United States
College men's lacrosse players in the United States